Fan Rong (born October 01, 1993) is a Chinese mixed martial artist who competes in the Middleweight division of ONE Championship. Rong has previously competed for Glory of Heroes and Wu Lin Feng.

Background 
WMMAA Champion Fan Rong‘s first exposure to the martial arts was in 2009, after he moved to Haerbin to attend university. A friend had invited him to tag along to Longyun MMA, and introduced him to his current coach, Jiang Long Yun.

Mixed martial arts career

Early career 
Although he fell short in his pro debut, Fan bounced back to go on a tear through the Chinese scene, finishing all but one opponent in an 11-bout win streak to earn a spot on the ONE Championship roster.

ONE Championship 
Rong made his ONE debut at ONE Championship: Hero's Ascent on January 25, 2019 against Reinier de Ridder, in a fight which he lost by a first round submission.

Rong faced Sherif Mohamed on June 15, 2019 at ONE Championship: Legendary Quest. He won the bout via technical knockout in the second round.

Rong was announced for ONE Championship: Inside the Matrix 3, where he faced Yuri Simões on November 13, 2020. Rong won the bout by unanimous decision.

Rong faced Vitaly Bigdash at ONE: Winter Warriors II on December 17, 2021. He lost via guillotine choke in the third round.

Rong was scheduled to face Aung La Nsang on January 14, 2023, at ONE on Prime Video 6. However, Fan withdrawn from the bout after having tested positive for COVID-19 and was replaced by Gilberto Galvão at a catchweight of 215 pounds. The pair was rescheduled for May 5, 2023, at ONE Fight Night 10.

Mixed martial arts record

|-
|Loss
|align=center|19–3 
| Vitaly Bigdash 
| Submission (guillotine choke)
| ONE: Winter Warriors II
| 
| align=center| 3
| align=center|0:41
| Kallang, Singapore
| 
|-
|Win
|align=center|19–2
|Yuri Simões 
|Decision (Unanimous)
|ONE Championship: Inside the Matrix 3
|
|align=center|3
|align=center|5:00
|Singapore 
|
|-
|Win
|align=center|18–2
|Sherif Mohamed
|TKO (punches)
|ONE Championship: Legendary Quest
|
|align=center|2
|align=center|3:50
|Shanghai, China
|
|-
|Loss
|align=center|17–2
|Reinier de Ridder
|Technical Submission (brabo choke)
|ONE Championship: Hero's Ascent
|
|align=center|1
|align=center|1:15
|Manila, Philippines 
|
|-
|Win
|align=center|17–1
|Solekh Khasanov
|Submission (armbar)
|Glory of Heroes 32: Huizhou
|
|align=center|3
|align=center|N/A
|Huizhou, China 
|
|-
|Win
|align=center|16–1
|Tony Angelov
|TKO (punches)
|Glory of Heroes: New Zealand vs China
|
|align=center|2
|align=center|N/A
|Auckland, New Zealand 
|
|-
|Win
|align=center|15–1
|Felipe Nsue
|Submission (rear-naked choke)
|Glory of Heroes: Guangzhou
|
|align=center|3
|align=center|N/A
|Guangzhou, China
|
|-
|Win
|align=center|14–1
|Gevorg Sargsyan
|Submission
|Memorial Jorge Martins 13
|
|align=center|1
|align=center|N/A
|Martigny, Switzerland
|
|-
|Win
|align=center|13–1
|Falco Neto
|Submission 
|Glory of Heroes: Luoyang
|
|align=center|1
|align=center|N/A
|Luoyang, China
|
|-
|Win
|align=center|12–1
|Ilyar Iminov
|TKO (punches)
|Glory of Heroes: Conquest of Heroes 3
|
|align=center|2
|align=center|N/A
|Chengde, China
|
|-
|Win
|align=center|11–1
|Fozil Nuralizoda
|Submission (heel hook)
|Superstar Fight 7
|
|align=center|1
|align=center|N/A
|Loudi, China
|
|-
|Win
|align=center|10–1
|Askar Mozharov
|Submission (rear-naked choke)
|The Legend King Championship 1
|
|align=center|1
|align=center|1:19
|Hefei, China
|
|-
|Win
|align=center|9–1
|Rustam Yamashev
|Submission (shoulder choke)
|Faith FC 4
|
|align=center|1
|align=center|N/A
|Shenzhen, China
|
|-
|Win
|align=center|8–1
|Majid Sedigh Moridani
|TKO (punches)
|Chinese MMA Super League: Day 2
|
|align=center|1
|align=center|N/A
|Tianjin, China
|
|-
|Win
|align=center|7–1
|Byung In Kwak
|Decision (unanimous)
|Chinese MMA Super League: Day 1
|
|align=center|3
|align=center|5:00
|Tianjin, China
|
|-
|Win
|align=center|6–1
|Rufat Asadov
|Submission (choke)
|WLF E.P.I.C. 8
|
|align=center|2
|align=center|N/A
|Zhengzhou, China
|
|-
|Win
|align=center|5–1
|Nikita Osipov
|Submission
|WLF E.P.I.C. 7
|
|align=center|2
|align=center|N/A
|Zhengzhou, China
|
|-
|Win
|align=center|4–1
|Valeriy Izansky
|TKO (punches)
|WLF E.P.I.C. 5
|
|align=center|1
|align=center|N/A
|Zhengzhou, China
|
|-
|Win
|align=center|3–1
|Lingyu Liang
|TKO (punches)
|Chinese MMA Super League: Season 5 Day 5
|
|align=center|1
|align=center|N/A
|Jinzhou, China
|
|-
|Win
|align=center|2–1
|Wang Lei
|Submission (guillotine choke)
|Chinese MMA Super League: Season 5 Day 3
|
|align=center|1
|align=center|N/A
|Jinzhou, China
|
|-
|Win
|align=center|1–1
|Peng Wang
|Submission (rear-naked choke)
|Chinese MMA Super League: Season 5 Day 1
|
|align=center|1
|align=center|1:46
|Jinzhou, China
|
|-
|Loss
|align=center|0–1
|Takashi Yamashita
|KO (head kick)
|Art of War 16
|
|align=center|1
|align=center|1:04
|Beijing, China
|
|-

References 

Chinese male mixed martial artists
Mixed martial artists utilizing boxing
Mixed martial artists utilizing wrestling
People from Jinzhou
Living people
1993 births